is a Japanese alternative rock group from Sakura, Chiba, Japan. The band members are Motoo Fujiwara (vocals, rhythm), Hiroaki Masukawa (guitar), Yoshifumi Naoi (bass) and Hideo Masu (drums). Since their conception in 1994, they have released 27 singles and 10 albums. They are a popular group in Japan; every release since their third single, "Tentai Kansoku", has charted in the top ten on the Oricon Weekly Charts. Their music has been used in various video games and as theme songs for movies, television shows and anime in Japan.

History 
The members first met in kindergarten and were classmates throughout their primary and secondary education. Bump of Chicken's first performance was in 1994, during their ninth grade cultural festival, playing a cover of The Beatles' version of "Twist and Shout". In 1996, their song "Danny" won an award on 96TFM.

In 1999, Bump of Chicken released their first album, Flame Vein, on High Line Records. Later that year, they released their first single, "Lamp".  In 2000, they released The Living Dead, their final release on High Line. They also held their first live tour, "", during March and April.

Later in 2000, the group switched to Toy's Factory, releasing their first single on the label, "Diamond", in September. Bump of Chicken's first big success occurred when their single, "Tentai Kansoku", appeared on the Oricon Weekly Charts in 2001. They held two live tours, " 2001" beginning in March and "Surf Porkin'" beginning in July. In October, they released "Harujion". They released their first album on Toy's Factory, Jupiter, in February 2002 and it was their first number one on the Oricon Weekly Charts. In the summer of 2002, their music was featured on the Japanese TV drama Tentai Kansoku, giving them more exposure.

At the end of 2002, the group released the single "Snow Smile".  2003 saw the release of their first double A-side single "Lost Man/Sailing day". "Sailing Day" was used as the ending theme to the animated movie One Piece: Dead End Adventure. The beginning of 2004 saw a slew of re-releases. "Arue", from their album Flame Vein, was released as a single in March.  They re-released their first two albums in April. Flame Vein received an extra song and was re-released as Flame Vein +1.  The Living Dead received no modifications.  In July, the group released "Only Lonely Glory", which became their first single to chart at number one on the Oricon Weekly Charts.   A month later, they released their fourth album, Yggdrasil, which was their second album to reach number one on the Oricon Weekly Charts. Shortly after, they released "Sharin no Uta", from Yggdrasil, as a single.

In 2005, Bump of Chicken released two singles, "Planetarium" and second double A-side single "Supernova/Karma". Karma was used as the theme song for Namco's "Tales of the Abyss". The band's next single, "Namida no Furusato" was used in a commercial for Lotte Airs. It became the group's second number one single. In 2007, they released the singles "Hana no Na" and "Mayday" on the same day. The two singles reached number one and two respectively on the Oricon Weekly Charts. Bump of Chicken released their fifth studio album, Orbital Period, on December 19, 2007. They released their first compilation album present from you on June 18, 2008. This album contains b-sides from singles and other non-album tracks.

On November 25, 2009, Bump of Chicken released its third double A-side single "R.I.P./Merry Christmas", their first single in two years. On April 14, 2010, they released "Happy" and then in the following week, another single, "Mahō no Ryōri (Kimi kara Kimi e)". These two singles also reached number one consecutively for two weeks on the Oricon Weekly Charts, the first time a band achieved this since Orange Range's "Love Parade" and "Onegai! Señorita" in 2005. They released a fourth double A-side single "Uchūhikōshi e no Tegami/Motorcycle" on October 13, 2010, and they released a music video for the song on Toy's Factory's YouTube channel on September 14, 2010, which surpassed 200,000 views in two days. On December 15, 2010, they released their sixth studio album, Cosmonaut, but it did not feature the song "Merry Christmas".

In 2011, Bump of Chicken announced that they wrote the song "Tomodachi no Uta" as the theme song for the animated 3D movie Doraemon: Nobita and the New Steel Troops: ~Angel Wings~, and "Tomodachi no Uta" was released as the single on February 23, 2011. They also released two singles, "Smile" on May 11, 2011, and "Zero" on October 19, 2011. "Zero" was used as the theme song for video game by Square Enix, Final Fantasy Type-0. Also in 2012, they released two more singles "Good Luck" and "Firefly", in January and September 2012, respectively. "Good Luck" was featured as the end theme to the Japanese film Always Sanchōme no Yūhi '64.

On March 6, 2013, Bump of Chicken released their first live video and album Bump of Chicken Gold Glider Tour 2012, recorded live at the Yoyogi National Gymnasium, Tokyo, Japan, on July 3, 2012.

On September 29, 2020, Bump of Chicken released the single "Acacia", which was featured in a music video named "GOTCHA!" uploaded on the Pokémon YouTube channel to celebrate the release of the Crown Tundra DLC in Pokémon Sword and Shield for the Nintendo Switch.

Band members

Motoo Fujiwara 
 is the composer, lyricist, rhythm guitarist, and main vocalist of the group. He has written most of the music, and has also drawn the artwork for their albums The Living Dead and Yggdrasil. In March 2006, he released a solo album entitled Song for Tales of the Abyss, which included "Karma" and instrumental versions of songs from the game Tales of the Abyss. He uses a Gibson 1960 Les Paul Special Single Cutaway, Sonic fender, Gibson J-45.  In August 2020, Fujiwara got married.

 Birth date: 
 Birthplace: Sakura, Chiba Prefecture
 Position: composer/lyricist/vocalist/rhythm guitarist

Hiroaki Masukawa 
 is the guitarist of the group, and also writes most of the hidden joke tracks for albums. His nicknames within the band are "Hiro", "Hose", (meaning "very thin"), and "Nikke". He uses a Gibson Les Paul Standard, Fender Stratocaster.

 Birth date: 
 Birthplace: Sakura, Chiba Prefecture
 Position: lead guitarist

Yoshifumi Naoi 
 is the bassist of the group, and is referred to as the "crowd pleaser". He has released an artbook containing his works, and helped with some album artwork. His nickname within the band is "Chama", a play on the Japanese phrase "Obotchama" referring to a rich family's son. He uses a Sonic Bass, Fender Jazz Bass 65.

On September 18, 2020, an article was published detailing an affair he had in 2016 and 2017 while hiding the fact that he was married and a father. Later the same day, he published an apology for his behavior, and announced that he would be taking a break from music. On June 6, 2021, he published yet another, longer apology for the same incident, at the same time announcing his return to the band.
 Birth date: 
 Birthplace: Sakura, Chiba Prefecture
 Position: bassist

Hideo Masu 
 is the drummer for the band. He uses a Canopus Maple Shell.

 Birth date: 
 Birthplace: Sakura, Chiba Prefecture
 Position: drummer

Songs in popular culture
Their single "Arue" is a song dedicated to the fictional character Rei Ayanami, from the anime series Neon Genesis Evangelion. The song is listed as R.A., the initials of the aforementioned character.

Their song "Sailing Day" is used at the end credits of the animated film One Piece The Movie: Dead End no Bōken. The same song is also featured in the Guitar Freaks and Drummania series of arcade games.

The songs "Tentai Kansoku", "K", "Sailing Day", "Karma" and "Mayday" were later used in the musical arcade game by Bemani in GuitarFreaks, DrumMania, Jubeat, Reflec Beat Limelight and Pop'n Music. "Tentai Kansoku" was also featured in Metcha! Taiko no Tatsujin DS: Nanatsu no Shima no Daibouken. "Tentai Kansoku" and "Karma" were also featured as covers by the band Afterglow in the mobile game for BanG Dream!.

The song "Karma" from their "Supernova / Karma" single is the main theme for Namco's Tales of the Abyss video game. It also is used on the anime adaptation of the game as the opening theme.

The movie Doraemon: Nobita and the New Steel Troops—Winged Angels released on March 5, 2011, uses BUMP OF CHICKEN's song "Tomodachi no Uta" as its ending song. All 4 members have loved Doraemon for its unique and loving characters and story and have said that it is an honor to be chosen to sing for the new Doraemon movie.

The song "Hello, World!" from their "Hello World! / Colony" single is used as the opening song of the TV anime adaptation of the manga Blood Blockade Battlefront.

Their song "Zero" was also featured as the opening song for Final Fantasy Type-0.

Their songs are used as the opening and closing themes for episodes 1-11 of the anime, March Comes in like a Lion (３月のライオン). The opening is "Answer", while the closing is "Fighter". Around 2014, before the manga was adapted into an anime, they and the manga's author, Chika Umino, collaborated to make a CGI music video set to their single, "Fighter". The video was made into a stand-alone story promoting the original manga, called March Comes in like a Lion meets BUMP OF CHICKEN. In early April 2017 they posted a long form music video for Answer to YouTube.

Their song "GO" was featured as the opening song for the 2017 anime adaptation of the Japanese mobile game, Granblue Fantasy.

Their songs "Sirius" and "Spica" are the opening and closing theme songs respectively for Satelight's (Shoji Kawamori) anime Juushinki Pandora, released in 2018.

Their song "Gekkou" was used as the opening song for the 2018 TV anime adaptation of the manga Karakuri Circus.

Their song "Acacia" was used in a music video collaboration with the Pokémon franchise.

Their song "Chronostasis" was used for Detective Conan: The Bride of Halloween (Meitantei Conan: Halloween no Hanayome), the 25th anime film in the Detective Conan franchise.

Rie Takahashi performed a cover of the group's song "Tentai Kansoku" as the second ending theme music for Teasing Master Takagi-san: The Movie (2022) during its second week of release.

Their song "SOUVENIR" was featured as the opening song for the 2022 anime adaptation of the manga Spy × Family. Specifically, it was the opening song for the 2nd cour of the series' first season.

Discography

Studio albums

Compilation albums

Other albums

Singles

Digital download only

Videos

Awards and nominations

Space Shower Music Video Awards

|-
| 2004
| Lost Man
| Best Your Choice
| 
|-
| 2005
| Sharin no Uta
| Best Your Choice
| 
|-
| rowspan="2"| 2008
| rowspan="2"| Hana no Na
| Best Your Choice
| 
|-
| Best Video of the Year
| 
|-
| 2014
| Niji o Matsu Hito
| Best Your Choice
| 
|-
| 2015
| Ray
| Best Your Choice
| 
|-
| 2016
| rowspan="4"|
| rowspan="4"|  Best Group Artist
| 
|-
| 2017
| 
|-
| 2018
| 
|-
| 2019
| 
|-
| 2020
|Aurora
|Best Video of the Year
| 
|}

MTV Video Music Awards Japan

|-
| 2012
| Good Luck (from Always Sanchōme no Yūhi '64 film)
| Best Video from a Film
| 
|-
| 2014
| Niji o Matsu Hito (from Gatchaman film)
| Best Video from a Film
| 
|-
|2016
|Butterflies
|Best Album of the Year
| 
|-
|2019
|Aurora
|Best Rock Video
| 
|}

References

External links
 Bump of Chicken Official Website

Japanese alternative rock groups
Musical groups established in 1996
Musical groups from Chiba Prefecture
Toy's Factory artists
Vocaloid musicians